The 1961 New Jersey gubernatorial election was held on November 7, 1961. Democratic nominee Richard J. Hughes defeated Republican nominee James P. Mitchell with 50.37% of the vote.

Primary elections
Primary elections were held on April 18, 1961.

Democratic primary

Candidates
Richard J. Hughes, former Superior Court judge
Weldon R. Sheets
Eugene E. Demarest

Results

Republican primary

Candidates
James P. Mitchell, former United States Secretary of Labor
Walter H. Jones, State Senator from Bergen County
Wayne Dumont, State Senator from Warren County
Louis Berns

Results

General election

Candidates
Major party candidates
Richard J. Hughes, Democratic
James P. Mitchell, Republican

Other candidates
Reinhart V. Metzger, Conservative
Henry B. Krajewski, Veterans Bonus Now
Edward J. Lueddeke, Prosperity with Liberty
G. George Addonizio, Independent
Albert Ronis, Socialist Labor Party of America
Daniel Petrino, State Soldiers Bonus
Ruth F. Shiminsky, Socialist Workers

Results

References

1961
New Jersey
Gubernatorial
November 1961 events in the United States